The Swedish Union of Journalists (SJF) is a trade union in Sweden. It is affiliated with the Swedish Confederation of Professional Employees and the International Federation of Journalists.

Membership

The SJF has a membership of more than 19 000 members:
8,000 work within the daily newspapers
2,300 with public radio and television
1,800 as freelancers
900 as information officers or editors of small membership papers
800 with magazines
500 with private commercial audiovisual companies
400 with political or specialized reviews
1,700 are retired members, 700 are students in journalism, and an additional 1,000 are unemployed.

Swedish Confederation of Professional Employees
International Federation of Journalists
Trade unions in Sweden
Journalists' trade unions
Swedish journalism organizations
Trade unions established in 1901